József Breznay (20 September 1916 Budapest – 18 February 2012 Budapest) was a Hungarian painter.

Biography 
1934-39: studied at the University of Fine Arts Budapest. His Masters were Bertalan Karlovszky, Ágost Benkhard, Rezső Burghardt and István Szőnyi. 
1938-39: he was Szőnyi's teaching assistant.

According to the proposal of Prof. Tibor Gerevich he was appointed to receive the scholarship of the Rome Prize. He worked there as a resident of Collegium Hungaricum between 1939 and 1940.
In 1940 he received again the Rome Prize.
The young painter matured during these years to a painter of full-fledged style, further developing the school of painters of Nagybánya, (Baia Mare, Romania) featuring a relaxed pictorial quality.

Personal Exhibitions 
 1946: Fókusz Galéria, Budapest, Hungary
 1948: Művész Galéria, Budapest, Hungary
 1953: Fényes Adolf Terem, Budapest, Hungary
 1954: Fényes Adolf Terem, Budapest, Hungary
 1961: István Csók Galéria, Budapest, Hungary
 1962: Galerie Barbizon, Paris, France
 1963: Galerie l'Indifferent, Lyon, France
 1964: Malkasten Kunstverein, Düsseldorf, Germany
 1965: Kunstkabinett, Hannover, Germany
 1966: Künstlerkreis, Marburg, Germany
 1969: Konshallen, Uppsala, Sweden
 1970: Kunstverein, Lingen, Germany
 1971: Galerie Pfeiffer, Brussels, Belgium
 1972: Galerie Oranje, Ghent, Belgium
 Galerie Goltz, München, Germany
 Palace of Arts (Budapest) Műcsarnok, Budapest, Hungary
 1973: Galleria Antelami, Parma, Italy
 1974: Galleria l'Ascendente, Milan, Italy
 1975: Staatsgalerie, Würzburg, Germany
 Galerie A. Vynecke van Eyck, Ghent, Belgium
 1977: Galleria Mariani, Parma, Italy
 Club Amici dell'Arte, Ferrara, Italy
 Kossuth Művelődési Ház, Kölesd, Hungary
 1978: Galleria Romana, Milan, Italy
 Művelődési Központ, Csorna, Hungary
 1979: Galleria Leonessa, Brescia, Italy
 Galleria Sant'Andrea, Parma, Italy
 1981: Szőnyi Terem, Miskolc, Hungary
 1982: Palace of Arts (Budapest), Műcsarnok, Budapest, Hungary
 Gallery Park, Witten, Germany
 1983: Galleria Sant'Andrea, Parma, Italy
 1984: Gallery Park, Witten, Germany
 1985: Staatsgalerie, Hattingen, Germany
 1988: Galerie am Gewölbe, Tübingen, Germany
 1990: Galleria Sant'Andrea, Parma, Italy
 1996: Collegium, Budapest, Hungary
 1997: Galerie Marceau, Paris, France
 1998: Szőnyi István Múzeum, Zebegény, Hungary
 2000: Galleria Duomo, Milan, Italy
 2001: Librerie Felltrinelli, Milan, Italy
 La Rotonde, Paris, France
 2003: Galéria Melange, Budapest, Hungary
 2006: Olof Palme Millenniumi Szalon, Budapest, Hungary

Group exhibitions 

 1940-1941-1947: Római Magyar Akadémia, Rome, Italy
 1943: Nemzeti Szalon, Budapest, Hungary
 1944-50 years: Hungarian Art, Fővárosi Képtár, Budapest, Hungary
 1946: Fókusz Galéria, Budapest, Hungary
 1947: KEVE Kiállítás, Nemzeti Szalon, Budapest, Hungary
 1948: 90 Artists, Nemzeti Szalon, Budapest, Hungary
 1950-1968: I-II. Magyar Képzőművészeti Kiállítás, Budapest, Hungary
 1955: 10 Years Art, Műcsarnok, Budapest, Hungary
 Hermann Ottó Múzeum, Miskolc, Hungary
 to begin 1955: Országos Képzőművészeti Kiállítás
 1957: Salon Populiste, Musee Municipal d'Art Moderne, Paris, France
 Tavaszi Tárlat, Műcsarnok, Budapest, Hungary
 1958: 50. Salon d'Automne, Paris, France
 1960: IV. Exposition Internationale de Peinture, Vichy, France
 1968: Gallery Guggenheim Jeune, London, England
 Folkwang Museum, Essen, Germany
 1969: Magyar Művészet, Műcsarnok Budapest, Hungary
 1971: XX. Painting Biennale, Firenze, Italy
 to begin 1976: Miskolci Teli Tárlat, Miskolc Galéria, Hungary
 1978: Festészet'77, Műcsarnok, Budapest, Hungary
 1983: House of Humour and Satire, Gabrovo, Bulgaria
 1984: Országos Képzőművészeti Kiállítás '84, Műcsarnok, Budapest, Hungary
 1988: Tavaszi Tárlat, Műcsarnok, Budapest, Hungary
 1989: XIV. Salon de Peinture de Bourbonne-les-Bains: Gold Medal

Awards, Prizes 

 1937: Rotary Club Prize, Hungary
 1939: Gold Medal of the Hungarian College of Fine Arts, Hungary
 1939-1941-1947: Scholarship of the Hungarian Academy of Rome, Hungary
 1942: Nemes Marcell Prize-Szinyei Társaság, Hungary
 1943: Wolfner Gyula Prize-Szinyei Társaság, Hungary
 1953: Mihály Munkácsy Prize, Hungary
 to begin 1957: member of Salon des Indépendants, Paris, France
 1958: István Csók Medal, Hungary
 1962: Grand Prix, Deauville, France
 1964: Bronze Medal of the European Council of Arts
 1976: Silver Medal of Munka Érdemrend, Hungary
 1978: First prize of Carrara dei Marmi, Italy
 1989: Gold Medal of Bourbonne-les-Bains, France

Public collections 

 Hungarian National Gallery (Magyar Nemzeti Galéria), Budapest, Hungary
 Damjanich János Múzeum, Szolnok, Hungary
 Museum of Applied Arts (Budapest) (Iparművészeti Múzeum), Hungary
 Theatre Lingen, Lingen, Germany
 Herend Porcelain Manufactory Ltd. (Herendi Porcelángyár), Herend, Hungary
 Mobile Museum of Art, Alabama, United States

Public Works 

 1939: Mezőkovácsháza, fresco in collaboration with Eugénia Bonda.
 1954: Komlò
 Secco, Beloiannisz Gyàr
 Berente Church, fresco in collaboration with Gabor Breznay and András Breznay

Bibliography 

 Aszalòs Endre: Breznay Jòzsef, 1982, Mai Magyar Művészet
 Breznay József, Műcsarnok 1982, catalogue
 Breznay József, Evolúció, 1996, catalogue
 József Breznay, Mostra retrospectiva, 1997, catalogue
 Breznay József, Public and Private Collections, 2007

Films, videos 

 MTV 1: Vitray Tamás: Csak ülök és mesélek: A Breznay csalàd, (The Breznay Family) 25 December 1996
 HírTV : Family tale (Családmese) : " Vasarely, az ecsetkirály és a Breznay család", 25 December 2005
 Ostoros Ágnes: "A történetek igazak". Portrait of József Breznay, (documentary film) 2007. Cinema Bem, Budapest, 2008 January

References
 Artist's website: 

Hungarian painters
1916 births
2012 deaths
Artists from Budapest
Hungarian University of Fine Arts alumni